"The Early Deaths of Lubeck, Brennan, Harp, and Carr" is a short story written by American poet and novelist Jesse Ball.  The story was originally published in The Paris Review and won the Plimpton Prize for 2008.

References

External links
"The Early Deaths of Lubeck, Brennan, Harp, and Carr" in The Paris Review

2008 short stories
American short stories
Works originally published in The Paris Review